The Makassar Uprising, also known as Andi Aziz rebellion, was a skirmish in Makassar, Sulawesi, between former Royal Dutch East Indies Army soldiers under Captain Andi Aziz and the Republic of the United States of Indonesia government. The purpose of the uprising was to revolt against the incorporation of the Indonesian federated "states" into the Indonesian Republic. However, the uprising was quashed in a little over two weeks when troops under Lieutenant Colonel Suharto and Colonel Alexander Evert Kawilarang arrived at Makassar to find only light resistance.

The East Indonesian government refused to condone Aziz's actions and he was subsequently arrested in Jakarta on 14April while attempting to negotiate with the republican authorities. The Makassar Uprising only facilitated republican control over the federal states.

Background 
Following the end of World War II in August 1945, the Dutch sought to re-establish control over the East Indies, modern-day Indonesia. While Australian and Dutch troops managed to occupy much of eastern Indonesia with minimal resistance, Anglo-Dutch forces in Java and Sumatra were challenged by nascent Republican nationalists advocating self-rule under Sukarno. The Republican goal of a unitary Republic of Indonesia centered on Java clashed with Dutch decolonization efforts to implement a system of federal states which was part of a Dutch commonwealth. Negotiations were dogged by skirmishes and police actions.

In Sulawesi, resistance to Dutch rule was successfully suppressed by Captain Raymond Westerling, who drew controversy for his use of arbitrary terror tactics including rounding up villages and summarily executing members until they submitted information. However, the eradication of Republican forces paved the way for the establishment of a more amenable East Indonesian civil administration based in Makassar. In South Sulawesi, they also replaced more than a quarter of the pro-Republican local nobility including the Rajahs of Bone and Lawu, prompting the remaining rajahs to collaborate with the Dutch authorities.

In December 1948, the Dutch launched a second police action Operatie Kraai which succeeded in capturing much of Java and Sumatra as well as the Republican leadership in Yogyakarta. However, this action only fuelled opposition to the Dutch in the United Nations, the United States, Australia and India. The United States threatened to suspend Marshall plan aid to the Dutch including funds vital for Dutch post-World War II rebuilding that had so far totalled $US 1 billion. The Netherlands Government had spent an amount equivalent to almost half of this funding their campaigns in Indonesia. On 24 December, the UN Security Council called for the end of hostilities. In January 1949, it passed a resolution demanding the reinstatement of the Republican government.

International pressure forced the Dutch to continue negotiations with the Republicans, culminating in the Dutch agreeing to recognise Indonesian sovereignty over a new federal state known as the United States of Indonesia (RUSI). It would include all the territory of the former Dutch East Indies with the exception of Netherlands New Guinea; sovereignty over which it was agreed would be retained by the Netherlands until further negotiations with Indonesia. Sovereignty was transferred on December 27, 1949. The new RUSI government consisted of both Republicans and Federalists but was short-lived due to animosity between the two parties and growing popular support for a unitary state.

On January 23, 1950, Westerling and the federalist Cabinet member Sultan Hamid II attempted to overthrow the Republican government by using Westerling's private Legion of Ratu Adil to launch simultaneous attacks on Bandung, Jakarta and Blora in the short-lived APRA Coup d'état. The coup failed since the majority of the KNIL leadership refused to support Westerling's actions and intercepted his munitions convoy. This only added fuel to public dissatisfaction with the federal system, leading to the integration of the states of Pasundan and West Kalimantan into the Republic of Indonesia by April 1950.

The uprising 
Due to the strong presence of KNIL troops in Sulawesi and other parts of East Indonesia, there was much suspicion towards the intentions of the unitary central government in Jakarta. Efforts were made to integrate the KNIL into the RUSI army, but this was impeded by mutual distrust between the predominantly Javanese Indonesian military and the largely Ambonese and Minahasan KNIL. In the State of East Indonesia, the Justice Minister Soumokil banned all public meetings and jailed pro-Republican leaders in response to public pro-Republic protests. On April 5, 1950, the Jakarta central government dispatched a force of 700 Republican troops under Colonel Sunkono and Colonel Mokoginto to persuade the East Indonesian President Soekawati to join the Republic and to step down.  These troops were further augmented by 200 pro-Republican guerrillas in the Makassar region.

Fears that this deployment would shift the balance in favour of pro-Republican elements and lead to disorder prompted Soumokil and other pro-federal elements to convince the local KNIL forces to launch a coup. KNIL Captain Andi Aziz commanded a force of 350 KNIL troops in Makassar. At the urging of Soumokil, Aziz's force overwhelmed the few local Republican troops and their guerrilla allies before seizing control of the city. They then prevented the 700 RUSI reinforcements from landing by firing artillery at their troop transports, forcing them to retreat. Aziz defended his actions by claiming to uphold the Federal Constitution which guaranteed the autonomy of the federal states including East Indonesia. He also claimed that he had discovered documents alleging that Sukarno was collaborating with the Indonesian Communist Party and the Soviet Union to destroy the “capitalist and upper classes” and establish a unitary state, paving the way for a communist take-over.

However, most of the East Indonesian government including President Soekawati refused to condone or support his coup. By April 13, President Sukarno had denounced Aziz's insurgency and deployed RUSI forces to crush the rebellion in South Sulawesi. Wanting to maintain working relations with the Jakarta government, Soekawati convinced Aziz to come to Jakarta to negotiate with Sukarno's government. He was also granted a safe-conduct pass by Sukarno and the United Nations Commission for Indonesia to fly to Jakarta. However upon arrival, he was arrested by the Sultan of Yogyakarta Hamengkubuwono IX who incarcerated him in his private prison. The capture of Aziz ended resistance and allowed 2,000 RUSI troops to swiftly occupy Makassar by April 21.

Aftermath 
The elimination of the KNIL as a political actor allowed Republican factions in the East Indonesian parliament to assume a majority. The federalist Prime Minister Diapari was replaced by Martinus Putuhena, who declared martial law and established an Emergency Government in South Sulawesi which was controlled directly by Jakarta. Following the release of Republican political prisoners, guerrilla forces in the upland regions launched attacks against pro-Dutch aristocrats in the urban areas. This led to further fighting with the remaining KNIL units and the abolishment of local aristocratic principalities.

The new East Indonesian Cabinet was pro-Republican and advocated the integration of East Indonesia into the unitary Indonesian Republic. On April 21, 1950, President Soekawati successfully negotiated East Indonesia's integration, heeding majority support for a unitary state. This prompted all thirteen constituent territories within East Indonesia with the exception of South Moluccas to secede from East Indonesia and join Sukarno's Republic. Following further negotiations, the RUSI was dissolved on August 15 in favour of a unitary Republic of Indonesia.  Due to his leading role in the uprising, Aziz was subsequently tried in 1952 and sentenced to 14 years imprisonment.

Bibliography 
 
 
  – translated from the French to English by Waverley Root as –

References 

1950 in Indonesia
Cold War rebellions
Conflicts in 1950
April 1950 events in Asia